Patrick Duflos (born 29 December 1965) is a French former volleyball player. He competed in the men's tournament at the 1988 Summer Olympics.

References

1965 births
Living people
French men's volleyball players
Olympic volleyball players of France
Volleyball players at the 1988 Summer Olympics
Sportspeople from Calais
Cuprum Lubin coaches